|}

The Hyde Stakes is a Listed flat horse race in Great Britain open to horses aged three years or older.
It is run at Kempton Park over a distance of 1 mile (1,609 metres), and it is scheduled to take place each year in November.

The race was first run in 2007.

Winners

See also
 Horse racing in Great Britain
 List of British flat horse races

References
Racing Post: 

Flat races in Great Britain
Kempton Park Racecourse
Open mile category horse races
Recurring sporting events established in 2007
2007 establishments in England